Ignazio Leone (19 April 1923 – 30 December 1976) was an Italian film actor. He appeared in 105 films between 1952 and 1976.

Selected filmography
 The Walk (1953)
 I Chose Love (1953)
 Amici per la pelle (1955)
 A Woman Alone (1956)
 Wives and Obscurities (1956)
 Piece of the Sky (1959)
 Slave of Rome (1960)
 Le pillole di Ercole (1962)
 I Don Giovanni della Costa Azzurra (1962)
 Julius Caesar Against The Pirates (1962)
 Zorro and the Three Musketeers (1963)
 002 Operazione Luna (1965)
 Special Code: Assignment Lost Formula (1966)
 Electra One (1967)
 I 2 deputati (1968)
 The Two Crusaders (1968)
 Brutti di notte (1968)
 Indovina chi viene a merenda? (1969) 
 Io non spezzo... rompo (1971)
 Armiamoci e partite! (1971)
 A forza di sberle (1974)

External links

1923 births
1976 deaths
Italian male film actors
20th-century Italian male actors